Midinci  is a village in the municipality of Kičevo, North Macedonia. It used to be part of the former Zajas Municipality.

Demographics
As of the 2021 census, Midinci had 60 residents with the following ethnic composition:
Macedonians 25
Albanians 28
Others 1
Persons for whom data are taken from administrative sources 6

References

External links

Villages in Kičevo Municipality
Albanian communities in North Macedonia